Kristabel Doebel-Hickok (born April 28, 1989) is an American professional racing cyclist, who currently rides for UCI Women's World Tour Team .

Major results

2015
 1st Stage 5 Tour Cycliste Féminin International de l'Ardèche
 4th Overall Tour de Feminin-O cenu Českého Švýcarska
1st Stage 5
 8th Overall Tour Femenino de San Luis
2016
 9th Philadelphia Cycling Classic
2017
 4th Overall Tour of California
 4th Giro del Trentino Alto Adige-Südtirol
 7th Giro dell'Emilia Internazionale Donne Elite
 10th Overall Tour of the Gila
2019
 3rd Grand Prix Cycliste de Gatineau
 4th Overall Women's Tour Down Under
 4th Overall Tour of the Gila
 5th Overall Joe Martin Stage Race
 5th Overall Colorado Classic
 7th Overall Tour of California
 8th Overall Kreiz Breizh Elites Dames
2020
 3rd Trophée des Grimpeuses
2021
 1st  Mountains classification Setmana Ciclista Valenciana
2022
 2nd Overall Tour of the Gila
1st Stages 1 & 3 (ITT)
1st  Mountains classification 
 8th La Flèche Wallonne Féminine

See also
 List of 2023 UCI Women's Teams and riders

References

External links
 

1989 births
Living people
American female cyclists
People from Marina del Rey, California
Vanderbilt University alumni